Teiko Nishi (born January 24, 1967) is an American former women's basketball player. She played for the UCLA Bruins each year from 1985 until 1988. In 1987, Nishi, from North Torrance, California, was the only Asian American woman playing Division I basketball in southern California.

Nishi was heavily active in the Japanese American basketball leagues in Southern California throughout her childhood, and became a starter at North Torrance High School. While at North High, Nishi led her squad to CIF playoffs in her senior year, losing to Cheryl Miller's Riverside Poly in the playoffs.

While playing AAU basketball during the off-season, Nishi was heavily recruited by major universities nationwide, finally choosing UCLA over USC. In her career at UCLA, Nishi played with Jackie Joyner-Kersee, defeating the Cheryl Miller-led USC dynasty twice in their 1984-85 season.

After graduating from UCLA Nishi coached girls' basketball in South Torrance, California.

Nishi is currently coaching girls' basketball in Yorba Linda, CA.

Nishi is the older sister of Kikuo KeyKool Nishi of the rap group The Visionaries.

References

1967 births
Living people
American women's basketball coaches
American sportspeople of Japanese descent
American women's basketball players
Basketball coaches from California
Basketball players from California
Sportspeople from Los Angeles County, California
UCLA Bruins women's basketball players